Krya Vrysi (before 1927: Πλάσνα Plasna) is a town and a former municipality in Pella regional unit, Greece. Since the 2011 local government reform it is part of the municipality Pella, of which it is a municipal unit. The municipal unit has an area of 76.956 km2. It is located 75 km west of Thessaloniki and 2 km east of the Early Neolithic settlement of Nea Nikomedeia.

History
The town of Krya Vrysi, named Plasna before 1927, became an independent community in 1934, when it was separated from Valta. After the lake that covered the place was drained, the people had trouble finding drinkable water. When they found a source of cold, clear water, they called it "water from the Krya Vrysi (Cold Spring)", thus giving the town its name. The community Krya Vrysi became a municipality in 1990. The economy in the area is primarily based on agriculture with the farmers mainly growing corn and asparagus. They were also growing a great amount of Berley tobacco, until 2005 when the production was stopped in the region due to European Union's economical issues.

Annual events
Krya Vrysi, being the centre for many smaller villages, is the host of various annual events. The Krya Vrysi Carnival has been the biggest regional multi-event including a large carnival procession. It takes place each year on the carnival three days' holiday since 1988 and has become an important tourist attraction for the town. During the Greek economic crisis it was temporarily paused (2009-2011). Another major annual event is the Agrotechnical Expo which is held in September. It combines a number of agricultural-related exhibits with a funfair (gr. πανηγύρι).

Sports
Krya Vrysi is home to the sport club Apollon Kryas Vrysis (Απόλλων Κρύας Βρύσης) that was founded in 1960. It currently competes in the 4th national division but had notably risen to the 2nd in the past.

Notable natives
 Demosthenes Delegiannis (*1938), lawyer, politician. From 1973 to 1981 he had been Member of Parliament.
 Takis Fostiropoulos, *1950, President of the Piraeus Coaches Association (Σύνδεσμος Προπονητών Ποδοσφαίρου Πειραιά) that received honours from UNESCO (2016). In 1990 he had been the first coach of the then founded Greece women's national football team, and 1989–2002 coach of the Joint Youth and Children Groups of Piraeus Football Clubs Association. 1966–74 he had been team member of Apollon Kryas Vrysis (Απόλλων Κρύας Βρύσης) when the team had been playing in the second national league.
 Nikolaos Fostiropoulos, *1958, had been elected to the Karlsruhe (Germany) City Council from 1999 to 2019 as a member of the left party Die Linke. He is founder and owner of company alfatraining that has been listed in the top 20 of German providers of further education.
 Konstantinos Fostiropoulos, *1960, physicist, 2003–2016 head of the Organic Solar Cells Group at HZB. In 1989/90 he was the first to develop a method to synthesize the "football molecule" C60 fullerene. (ΤΟ ΒΗΜΑ)

References

External links
 

Populated places in Pella (regional unit)

el:Δήμος Πέλλας#Κρύας Βρύσης